Denis Couttet (26 February 1900 – 30 August 1956) was a French cross-country skier. He competed in the men's 18 kilometre event at the 1924 Winter Olympics.

References

External links
 

1900 births
1956 deaths
French male cross-country skiers
Olympic cross-country skiers of France
Cross-country skiers at the 1924 Winter Olympics
People from Chamonix
Sportspeople from Haute-Savoie
20th-century French people